Harvey "Red" Stapleford ( – c. February 1983) was a Canadian ice hockey player and coach. He played for Streatham between 1934 and 1938 before joining the Wembley Lions for the 1938–39 season. He returned to Streatham as player-coach in 1946. After retiring from playing, Stapleford remained as the coach for Streatham until 1954, during which time he was named All Star coach three times. He was inducted to the British Ice Hockey Hall of Fame in 1986.

He was the father of Sally-Anne Stapleford.

External links
British Ice Hockey Hall of Fame entry

1912 births
British Ice Hockey Hall of Fame inductees
Canadian ice hockey left wingers
Wembley Lions players
1983 deaths
Canadian expatriate ice hockey players in England